Contemporary European History is an international peer-reviewed academic history journal, published by Cambridge University Press quarterly since 1992 and covering the history of Europe from 1918 onwards. Currently its editors are Dr Ludivine Broch (University of Westminster), Dr Matthew Frank (University of Leeds) and Dr Jessica Reinisch (Birkbeck, University of London). The Managing Editor is Dr Victoria Harris.

In 2022, Phillip W. Magness and Amelia Janaskie of the American Institute for Economic Research noted a "collapse" of "the basic mechanisms of peer review" at Contemporary, regarding the misquoting of Ludwig von Mises.  The issue was raised to Cambridge University Press, which declined action.

References

External links

European history journals
Publications established in 1992
English-language journals
Cambridge University Press academic journals
Quarterly journals